Parliamentary elections were held in Iraq in 1925, the first under the 1925 constitution. After the elections, Abdul-Muhsin Al-Saadoun became Prime Minister for the second time and founded the Progress Party to support the government and gain a parliamentary majority.

Aftermath
King Faisal I wanted to remove Al-Saadoun from his office after he tried to reduce the king's powers; Faisal succeeded in persuading the majority of the Chamber of Deputies to vote for Rashid Ali al-Gaylani for speaker, rather than the candidate nominated by the Al-Saadoun government, resulting in Al-Saadoun's resignation. Faisal was also concerned that Al-Saadoun had too many allies in the British government and had the trust of the British High Commissioner, so he made his two loyal men, Nuri al-Said and Jafar al-Askari, join the Progress Party and sabotage it.

Further reading
Faraj, Lutfi Jaafar. (1988). عبد المحسن السعدون: دوره في تاريخ العراق السياسي المعاصر. Baghdad: Al-Yaqatha Al-Arabiya Press. INLA 185609 (in Arabic)
Mohammed, Alaa Jasim. (1990). الملك فيصل الاول: حياته ودوره السياسي في الثورة العربية وسورية والعراق 1888–1933. Baghdad: Al-Yaqatha Al-Arabiya Press. INLA 227541 (in Arabic)

References 

Iraq
Elections in Iraq
1925 in Iraq